The Camel is a studio album by American trumpeter Idrees Sulieman recorded in 1964 in Sweden with Jamila Sulieman and released on the Columbia label.

Background
Tracks 1-4 were recorded on March, 19 and tracks 5-7 were recorded March 20, 1964 at EMI Studios, Stockholm.

Track list
Dawud's Bossa Nova – 6:18
Sad And Strange – 2:21
The Camel – 6:22
Long For The Blues – 3:18
Blues For Emanon – 7:51
I Remember Clifford – 6:10
I'll Remember April – 9:57

Credits
Alto saxophone – Christer Boustedt (tracks: 1 2 3 4), Idrees Sulieman (tracks: 1 2 3 4 7)
Baritone saxophone – Sahib Shihab (tracks: 1 2 3 4)
Bass – Björn Alke
Bottle – Ole Kock Hansen (tracks: 4)
Congas – Jamila Sulieman (tracks: 4)
Cow bell – Sahib Shihab (tracks: 4)
Cow horn – Gunnar Östling (tracks: 4)
Drums – Fredrik Norén (tracks: 5 6 7), Ivan Oscarsson (tracks: 1 2 3 4)
Liner notes – Lars Werner
Maracas – Idrees Sulieman (tracks: 4)
Photography – Bo Trenter
Piano – Göran Lindberg (tracks: 1 2 3 4), Lars Sjösten (tracks: 5 6 7)
Producer – Gunnar Lindqvist
Reeds – Christer Boustedt (tracks: 4), Fredrik Norén (tracks: 1)
Technician – Gunnar Lööf
Tenor saxophone – Bernt Rosengren (tracks: 1 2 3 4 5), Göran Östling (tracks: 1 2 3 4)
Trumpet – Bertil Lövgren (tracks: 1 2 3 4), Bo Broberg (tracks: 1 2 3 4), Idrees Sulieman (tracks: 5 6 7)
Vocals – Jamila Sulieman (tracks: 2 3)
Wood block – Fredrik Norén (tracks: 4), Jamila Sulieman (tracks: 1)

References

External links
 

Idrees Sulieman albums
1964 albums
Columbia Records albums